Disposable Half-Truths is the debut solo album by Richard H. Kirk, released originally on cassette by Industrial Records in 1980.  Recorded at Western Works Studio.  In 1992, The Grey Area re-released the CD version.

Track listing
 "Synesthesia"
 "Outburst"
 "Information Therapy"
 "Magic Words Command"
 "Thermal Damage"
 "Plate Glass Replicas"
 "Insect Friends of Allah"
 "Scatalist"
 "False Erotic Love"
 "L.D. 50"
 "L.D. 60"
 "Amnesic Disassociation"

Personnel
 Produced and recorded by Richard H. Kirk

References

1980 debut albums
Richard H. Kirk albums